Royal Palm Beach is a village in southeast Florida, located within Palm Beach County. The population was measured at 34,140 in the 2010 census. It is part of the Miami Metropolitan Area. Despite its name, the village is located approximately fifteen miles inland from the Atlantic Ocean.

The village offers a variety of activities for the outdoor and sports enthusiast including soccer, basketball, tennis, Pop Warner youth football and cheerleading, senior activities, and year-round golf programs. The public schools within the Village consist of "A"-rated elementary and middle schools and there are numerous private schools offering classes from pre-kindergarten through high school.

History

Incorporated on June 18, 1959, Royal Palm Beach has grown from a primarily uninhabited swamp and natural preserve and former Seminole hunting ground into a thriving village of an estimated 40,000 residents.

It was not until the 1950s, when Philadelphia supermarket magnates Sam and Hattie Friedland purchased  for approximately $1.25 million in what is now the Royal Palm Beach village and Acreage areas, that the natural wilderness landed on national fastest growing community lists (in its size category) in the 1980s. The Friedlands subsequently sold their land to Miami developer Arthur Desser, founder of Lefcourt Realty Group. About  were earmarked for Desser's Royal Palm Beach development.

It was Desser's vision that spurred the initial development of the Village of Royal Palm Beach. A massive drainage project ensued and in 1959, the state legislature granted a charter which named the development Royal Palm Beach.

According to a former Lefcourt engineer now living in Wellington, Desser wanted the name "Palm Beach" to be included in the new community's name, so it was decided that since Desser also liked the stately royal palms of Palm Beach, he would dub his development "Royal Palm Beach."

On June 30, 1959, with Seminole tribe officials on hand for the festivities (and to renounce all former claims to the land), a groundbreaking ceremony was held. Engineering began for the village's myriad waterways and a basic system of roads. A sales/recreational center was built with a motel facility in the area now occupied by the Royal Inn and two bedroom, one-bath model homes were erected starting at $8,250.

Village government—initially in the form of a developer-appointed council—later became popularly elected in 1964. Not until 1977 did the Village Council find a permanent home in the present Village Hall complex. To date, there have been 15 mayors who have served the village—some as single-term and part-term mayors—others, like Sam Lamstein (1982–1990), formal County Commissioner Tony Masilotti (1992–1998), and current Mayor David Lodwick (since 1998) have won voter approval for multi-terms.

Arthur Desser's dream of a "nouveau" Palm Beach were short-lived, however, with the bankruptcy of Lefcourt in 1961. His interest was bought out by Friedland who then established Royal Palm Beach Colony Inc. to continue village development. A grocery store magnate with no experience in the housing market, Friedland nonetheless was a savvy businessman who put together a team of professionals who set up a comprehensive land sales/development/building enterprise. With the late Herbert Kaplan as RPB Colony CEO, the company and the town grew slowly from 1960-67 — first in the original "Colony" section of floral-named streets east and west of the southern end of Royal Palm Beach Blvd., and then expanded with vigor into the Willows and LaMancha subdivisions (east of RPB Blvd.).

A marketing push began in 1979 to offer to builders tracts of land. With this growth phase the Village ballooned over the next 15 years. In 1983, Crestwood Middle School opened as the first community school followed in 1985 and 1989, respectively, by H.L. Johnson and Cypress Trails Elementary schools. Royal Palm Beach High School opened its doors to 1,100 students in 1997. Schools in the western communities continue to open in rapid succession — often with student bodies at or near capacity the first year. The 2002–2003 school year included the opening of the village's third elementary school on Okeechobee Blvd., just west of the Madison Green residential development.

In 1986, both Palms West Hospital and Wellington Regional Medical Center opened with 117 and 120 beds, respectively, and both are continuing with major expansion projects to meet the health care needs of local residents. With the hospitals came a building boom of medical office complexes on the campuses of both hospitals, as well as a Royal Palm Beach health center built by West Palm Beach's Good Samaritan Medical Center.

Since the village's inception, public safety has been foremost in the minds of residents and village officials. In June 1960, Joseph Klopp became the first Royal Palm Beach police chief. That first year, "Klopp the Cop" was the sole full-time officer with several auxiliary part-timers. Today, the accredited department counts nearly 50 sworn officers in addition to dispatchers, school crossing guards, detectives, a captain, and the chief based in a modern, computerized department in a building within the Village Hall complex.  In 2007 the policing duties were contracted out to the Palm Beach County Sheriff's department with a significant savings to the Village taxpayers.

Royal Palm Beach residents have also appreciated the security of a local fire department since a volunteer force of eight individuals was recruited in a construction trailer in January 1963. In 1969, the department moved its headquarters to a maintenance building in the present Commerce Park, which featured three bays and two trucks. A final move in 1976 to the department's building on Royal Palm Beach Blvd. enabled the department to expand its manpower and equipment. At that time, the department shared the building with the police department.

Village firefighters weren't paid until 1972 and the two full-timers on staff made about $6,000 a year. The following year, three more full-time firefighters were hired, and in 1975, Karl Combs became the first full-time chief at a salary of $13,500 a year. With a growing population, and thankfully few structural fires, the focus of the department expanded to include emergency medical treatment. Combs and a department lieutenant were enrolled in the county's first paramedic-rescue course and, less than a week later, answered a cardiac arrest call for a village resident who would have died had Combs not taken the course. Within the next four years, the department hired 18 additional paramedic/EMT trained firefighters. A second station opened in 1994 at the entrance of the Counterpoint Estates to cut response times to residents living in the State Road 7 area. In March 1999, following a council-authorized study by consultants, a controversial and much-debated decision was made to curtail an independent village fire department and instead merge equipment and personnel with Palm Beach County Fire-Rescue.

Village recreation needs were not overlooked during the booming growth period and since 1974.

Since 1990, Royal Palm Beach has been named as a Tree City USA. Its entire area is designated as a bird sanctuary.

Geography

Royal Palm Beach is located at  (26.705851, –80.226554).

According to the United States Census Bureau, the village has a total area of 10.1 square miles (26.1 km), of which 9.9 square miles (25.6 km) is land and 0.2 square mile (0.5 km) (1.79%) is water.

Climate

The climate of Royal Palm Beach is tropical.

Demographics

2020 census

As of the 2020 United States census, there were 38,932 people, 12,090 households, and 9,342 families residing in the village.

2010 census

As of 2010, there were 12,854 households, out of which 10.1% were vacant. In 2000, there were 7,604 households, of which 63.9% were child-free married couples, 42% had children under the age of 18 living in them, 11% had a female householder with no husband present, and 21.4% were non-related individuals. 17.2% of all households were made up of individuals, and 8.8% had someone living alone who was 65 years of age or older.  The average household size was 2.83 and the average family size was 3.20.

2000 census
In 2000, the village, the population was spread out, with 28.6% under the age of 18, 6.5% from 18 to 24, 30.8% from 25 to 44, 20.8% from 45 to 64, and 13.3% who were 65 years of age or older.  The median age was 37 years. For every 100 females, there were 91.3 males.  For every 100 females age 18 and over, there were 87.6 males.

In 2000, the median income for a household in the village was $54,766, and the median income for a family was $61,063. Males had a median income of $39,356 versus $29,991 for females. The per capita income for the village was $21,875.  About 3.7% of families and 4.3% of the population were below the poverty line, including 5.2% of those under age 18 and 5.9% of those age 65 or over.

As of 2000, speakers of English as a first language accounted for 85.80% of all residents, while Spanish was at 11.49%, and Tagalog as a mother tongue made up 0.48% of the population.

As of 2000, Royal Palm Beach had the eighty-ninth highest percentage of Cuban residents in the US, with 2.95%, while its Jamaican community had the thirty-second highest percentage in the US, with 4.10% of the population (tied with Tamarac and Goulds.)

Local government

Royal Palm Beach is governed by a mayor-council government.

Mission statement

The Mission of the Village of Royal Palm Beach Mayor and Council is to represent the public interest, promote quick, courteous response to residents' problems, provide leadership and direction to the Village's future, and assure the present and future fiscal integrity of the municipal government. The Village of Royal Palm Beach strives to provide its citizens with a clean, safe, family oriented community.

Mayor

The Mayor of Royal Palm Beach is currently Fred Pinto. His term expires in March 2022.

City Council

The city council consists of four chairs. The following are established and filled as:

 Seat 1: Councilman Jeff Hmara
 Seat 2: Councilman Richard Valuntas
 Seat 3: Vice Mayor Selena S. Samios
 Seat 4: Councilwoman Jan Rodusky

Public safety

Fire and Rescue Department

Currently, Palm Beach County Fire-Rescue provides fire protection and emergency medical services to the citizens of Royal Palm Beach.  There are two fire stations assigned to the village:
Station 28 – Engine 28, Rescue 28, Brush 28 and 3 command vehicles;
Station 29 – Rescue 29, Truck 29.

Station 28 is the headquarters for Battalion 2, which covers Royal Palm Beach and the other Palms West Communities.

Police Department

Law enforcement in Royal Palm Beach is provided by the Palm Beach County Sheriff's Office: District 9, which operates from a sub-station in Royal Palm Beach, and is staffed by 56 sworn deputies and 5 civilian employees.  It is commanded by Captain Ulrich Naujoks and Lieutenant Michael B.Ferrante.

Federal government
Located at 9300 Belvedere Road, the USCIS West Palm Beach Field Office handles a variety of immigration matters for eight Florida counties.

Local newspapers
The Town-Crier is a weekly, or more frequent, newspaper specifically located in and serving the Palms West Communities of Royal Palm Beach, Wellington, Loxahatchee Groves and The Acreage. Published weekly, the Town-Crier was founded by Bob Markey Sr. and family, but was sold in 1998 to the Manning family. The Town-Crier was published twice-weekly, with featured editions in nearby communities, on its own printing presses during the 1980s and early 1990s. The Town-Crier published the first newspaper Web site in Palm Beach County in 1995.

Palms West Monthly is a monthly news and features paper published by Rob Harris in and for the communities of Royal Palm Beach, Wellington and environs.

The Palm Beach Post is a daily newspaper serving all of Palm Beach County.

References

External links
 Royal Palm Beach Online (local news website)
 Royal Palm Beach official website
 Palm Beach County Fire-Rescue official website
 Palm Beach County Sheriffs Office District 9 official website

Villages in Palm Beach County, Florida
Villages in Florida
1959 establishments in Florida
Populated places established in 1959